The Kansas District Courts are the state trial courts of general jurisdiction in the U.S. state of Kansas. The Courts have original jurisdiction over all civil and criminal cases, and jury trials are held in the Courts. Among the cases litigated in the District Courts are domestic relations, lawsuits for damages, probate and administration of estates, legal guardianship, conservatorship, the mentally ill, juvenile justice, and small claims. It is here that the criminal and civil jury trials are held. 

Kansas' 105 counties are organized into 31 judicial districts, each consisting of between one and seven counties, with a differing number of judges in each district.

Counties

District 1 - Atchison, Leavenworth
District 2 - Jackson, Jefferson, Pottawatomie, Wabaunsee
District 3 - Shawnee
District 4 - Anderson, Coffey, Franklin, Osage
District 5 - Chase, Lyon
District 6 - Bourbon, Linn, Miami
District 7 - Douglas
District 8 - Dickinson, Geary, Marion, Morris
District 9 - Harvey, McPherson
District 10 - Johnson
District 11 - Cherokee, Crawford, Labette
District 12 - Cloud, Jewell, Lincoln, Mitchell, Republic, Washington
District 13 - Butler, Elk, Greenwood
District 14 - Chautauqua, Montgomery
District 15 - Cheyenne, Logan, Sheridan, Sherman, Rawlins, Thomas, Wallace
District 16 - Clark, Comanche, Ford, Gray, Kiowa, Meade
District 17 - Decatur, Graham, Norton, Osborne, Phillips, Smith
District 18 - Sedgwick
District 19 - Cowley
District 20 - Barton, Ellsworth, Rice, Russell, Stafford
District 21 - Clay, Riley
District 22 - Brown, Doniphan, Marshall, Nemaha
District 23 - Ellis, Gove, Rooks, Trego
District 24 - Edwards, Hodgeman, Lane, Ness, Pawnee, Rush
District 25 - Finney, Greeley, Hamilton, Kearny, Scott, Wichita
District 26 - Grant, Haskell, Morton, Seward, Stanton, Stevens
District 27 - Reno
District 28 - Ottawa, Saline
District 29 - Wyandotte
District 30 - Barber, Harper, Kingman, Pratt, Sumner
District 31 - Allen, Neosho, Wilson, Woodson

See also 
 Granville Pearl Aikman

External links
List of Kansas District Courts from the Kansas Judicial Center
Kansas state courts
Courts and tribunals with year of establishment missing